Belforêt-en-Perche (literally Belforêt in Perche) is a commune in the department of Orne, northwestern France. The municipality was established on 1 January 2017 by merger of the former communes of Le Gué-de-la-Chaîne (the seat), Eperrais, Origny-le-Butin, La Perrière, Saint-Ouen-de-la-Cour and Sérigny.

See also 
Communes of the Orne department

References 

Communes of Orne